St. Alexander's Church is a Roman Catholic church situated on Three Crosses Square in central Warsaw, Poland. It marks the historical southernmost entry into New World Street (Nowy Świat), the Royal Route and the Old Town. The temple is one of the most recognizable landmarks in Warsaw.

It was designed in the neoclassical style by renowned Polish architect Chrystian Piotr Aigner, and constructed in the years 1818–1825. In the late 19th century, St. Alexander's was remodelled into a larger, more grandiose Neo-Renaissance church, with two side towers and a higher ornate dome. It was destroyed during World War II and reconstructed in its initial simpler form by 1952.

History
The church was established by grateful Varsovians to commemorate tsar Alexander I of Russia, who conferred a constitution to the autonomous Kingdom of Poland after the country was partitioned decades earlier. The temple was designed by Chrystian Piotr Aigner and constructed on a circular ground plan covered by a dome (rotunda) between 1818 and 1825 in the Neoclassical style. The inspiration for the external shape of the shrine was the Pantheon in Rome. The foundation stone was laid on 15 June 1818 by Minister of State Treasury Jan Węgliński, replacing indisposed General Józef Zajączek, Namestnik of the Kingdom of Poland. St. Alexander's Church was consecrated on 18 June 1826 by primate Wojciech Skarszewski. The main altar in the interior was adorned with oil painting by Franciszek Smuglewicz depicting Crucifixion of Jesus.

In 1886–95 the church was rebuilt in Neo-Renaissance style, resulting in a much larger building with two prominent towers and a large peaked dome. The contest for the reconstruction design was announced on 14 April 1883 and the construction was entrusted to the author of the victorious design Józef Pius Dziekoński. The original rotunda was enlarged by adding three naves from the Ujazdowskie Avenue and two towers, enhancing the walls and the dome. The southern portico was embellished with relief of Blessing Christ among the Indigents and Cripples by Jan Kryński and sculptures by Teofil Gosecki. With these changes, the building became one of the largest in Warsaw.

During its existence the church has witnessed a number of historic events, including the 1912 funeral service for Bolesław Prus, who died a couple of blocks away in his apartment on ulica Wilcza (Wolf Street).

The church was destroyed during World War II, in the course of the Warsaw Uprising. During the aerial bombardment by German Luftwaffe in the first days of September 1944, the church was hit by 9 bombs resulting in collapse of the dome, main nave and one of the towers. In the years after the war it stood as a ruin while debates were conducted over whether to rebuild it to its prewar grander appearance, or to its original appearance before reconstruction. In the end, the church was rebuilt between 1949 and 1952 in a form similar to its original simpler design.

The 17th-century white marble statue of dead Christ by Roman or Florentine sculptor in left side altar was acquired in Rome by Stanisław Herakliusz Lubomirski between 1674 and 1694, and transferred to the St. Alexander's Church in 1826 from other location.

Images

See also

 Polish classicism
 St. Anne's Church
 St. Florian's Cathedral

References

External links
 Sacred Restorations: Polish Cathedrals Built Anew

Alexander's Church
Roman Catholic churches completed in 1825
19th-century Roman Catholic church buildings in Poland
Neoclassical architecture in Warsaw
Rebuilt buildings and structures in Poland
Church buildings with domes
Neoclassical church buildings in Poland